is a flight simulation game released for the Super Nintendo Entertainment System in 1995

Gameplay
Players control an aircraft pilot of either the United States or the Japanese naval aviations during World War II. Based aboard an aircraft carrier, players can do numerous missions in an effort to help the war effort. Campaign modes allow for all aircraft to have their own statistics and allow players to carry certain types of aircraft into the combat zone.

All aircraft come equipped with a throttle, a speedometer, an altimeter, a compass, and a fuel tank.

Reception 

On release, Famicom Tsūshin scored the game an 18 out of 40. Electronic Gaming Monthly gave it a 6.4 out of 10, commenting that "Carrier Aces does a great job of putting you in the cockpit of a classic fighter, and the strategy and two-player elements are a nice touch." GamePro praised the game for its variety of missions, well-balanced split screen, and engaging sounds, though they complained that the dogfighting is too difficult.

Notes

References

External links
 Carrier Aces at MobyGames
 Carrier Aces at GameFAQs
 Japanese title at super-famicom.jp 

1995 video games
Cybersoft (video game company) games
Super Nintendo Entertainment System games
Super Nintendo Entertainment System-only games
Synergistic Software games
Video games developed in the United States
World War II video games
Yumedia games
Aircraft carriers in fiction
GameTek games
Single-player video games